Mundu is an ethnic group in Western Equatoria in South Sudan. Its population in Sudan is about 50,000 to 60,000.  They speak Mündü, a Ubangian language.

References

Ethnic groups in South Sudan